French singer Louane has released four studio albums, one extended play, 20 singles (including two as a featured artist), and five promotional single.

Albums

Studio albums

Extended plays

Singles

As lead artist

As featured artist

Promotional singles

Other charted songs

Notes

References

Discographies of French artists